Japan–Netherlands relations are the bilateral relations between Japan and the Netherlands. Relations between Japan and the Netherlands date back to 1609, when the first formal trade relations were established.

History

Early trade 
In April of 1600, the ship "de Liefde" arrived on the coast of Bungo (present-day Usuki), with a dwindled, exhausted and sickly crew of survivors, the only ship remaining of the initial five vessels that departed from Rotterdam in 1598.  This crew included Jacob Quaeckernaeck, Melchior van Santvoort, Jan Joosten and William Adams. The crew and ship's contents were seized under orders from Tokugawa Ieyasu, the ruler at the time, and upon extracting information from some of the members brought to court about foreign affairs and the purpose of their mission, he permitted some to ship out on Red Seal Ships, thus starting the first 
trading collaborations between the Dutch and the Japanese.

When formal trade relations were established in 1609 at the behest of William Adams, the Dutch were granted extensive trading rights, and set up a trading outpost at Hirado, operated by the Dutch East India Company. They traded exotic Asian goods such as spices, textiles, porcelain, and silk. When the Shimabara uprising of 1637 happened, in which Christian Japanese started a rebellion against the Tokugawa shogunate, it was crushed with the help of the Dutch. As a result, all Christian nations who gave aid to the rebels were expelled, leaving the Dutch the only commercial partner from the West. Among the expelled nations was Portugal who had a trading post in Nagasaki harbor on an artificial island called Dejima. In a move of the shogunate to take the Dutch trade away from the Hirado clan, the entire Dutch trading post was moved to Dejima.

Military cooperation 
After the forcible opening of Japan by an American fleet commanded by Commodore Perry in 1854, the Netherlands was one of five countries to conclude a treaty with Japan in 1858, the so-called Ansei Treaties.

In 1860s, the Tokugawa Shogunate decided to modernize the Japanese fleet. To do this, orders were placed for modern steam powered warships. The first of which was the ZM SS Soembing, a gift from King William III of the Netherlands, which was renamed the Kankō Maru. To train Japanese sailors in the use of these new and powerful ships the Nagasaki Naval Training Center was established at the entrance of Dejima, to maximize interaction with Dutch naval know-how. Among the students at the Nagasaki Naval Training Center was Enomoto Takeaki, one of the founders of the Imperial Japanese Navy. Following the opening of Japan to trade, the Dutch special mission in Nagasaki was closed down in 1860 and first Dutch Consulate was opened in Edo.

World War II

Post war Japanese–Dutch relations 
The relations between Japan and the Netherlands after 1945 have been complicated. The invasion and occupation of the Netherlands East Indies during World War II, brought about the destruction of the colonial state in Indonesia, as the Japanese removed as much of the Dutch government as they could, weakening the post war grip the Netherlands had over the territory. Under diplomatic pressure from the United States, the Netherlands recognised Indonesian sovereignty in 1949 (see United States of Indonesia).

Emperor Hirohito landed in the Netherlands for a state visit on 8 October 1971. The visit was controversial because of the World War II troubles, and his delegation had to be protected from protesters. Japanese flags were burned by radical far-left activists of the Red Youth in front of the media and a bomb alert was reported when the Japanese embassy was threatened. The Japanese press reacted furiously to the reception. After the visit, the Dutch government repeatedly apologised to Japan, and the mood in Japan turned positive when Hirohito called the visit a "success."

Increasingly positive relations were largely felt in the consumer electronics industry, where the Netherlands's Philips and Japan's Sony - both major electronics companies at the time - worked together in making several popular mass market technologies such as the compact disc (CD).

On the 24 August 2009, the Netherlands released a commemorative 5 euro coin to celebrate 400 years of relations.

Education 

Amsterdam has one Japanese-medium day school, The Japanese School of Amsterdam. There is also a school in Rotterdam, the Japanese School of Rotterdam.

The Saturday Japanese supplementary schools in the Netherlands include Japanese Saturday School Amsterdam, Den Haag-Rotterdam Japanese Saturday School in Rotterdam, Stichting the Japanese School of Tilburg, and Stichting Maastricht Japanese Supplementary School. The Maastricht school was founded in 1992 as an outgrowth of the Joppenhoff International School. It began with 15 students, and grew as large as 30, but declined in concert with the economy, and as of 2004 enrolled just 20 students. The Saturday School of The Hague and Rotterdam was formed in 1996 from a merger of the two separate Saturday Japanese schools of those cities.

Diplomacy

Japan has an Embassy in The Hague.
The Netherlands has an Embassy in Tokyo and a Consulate-general in Osaka.

See also  
Foreign relations of Japan
Foreign relations of the Netherlands
Dutch Empire
Huis Ten Bosch
Japanese expatriates in the Netherlands
Japan-Netherlands Institute

References

External links 

 The Netherlands–Japan: Collections: the Memory of the Netherlands (het Geheugen van Nederland)
 Japan-Netherlands Exchange in the Edo Period (National Diet Library. Japan)
 Embassy of Japan in the Netherlands (在オランダ日本国大使館)
 Embassy of the Netherlands in Japan 
 Japanese business communities in the European Union (plus Switzerland) - an onomastics view (2013)

 
Bilateral relations of the Netherlands
Netherlands
Rangaku